Kim Jae-shin (born August 30, 1973) is a former football player from South Korea.

He was a member of the South Korea national under-20 football team at the 1993 FIFA World Youth Championship and went on to play as a professional in the K League with the Suwon Samsung Bluewings.

Club career statistics

External links
 
 

1973 births
Living people
Association football defenders
South Korean footballers
Suwon Samsung Bluewings players
K League 1 players
South Korea under-20 international footballers

Konkuk University alumni